Marie-Anne Rousselet, also known as Marie-Anne Tardieu, Veuve Tardieu (Widow Tardieu), (1732–1826) was a French engraver and illustrator.

About 
Marie-Anne Rousselet was born in Paris, France on 6 December 1732 to medal engraver Alexis Étienne Rousselet. All four of her siblings were also engravers. She was related to engraver, Gilles Rousselet (1614–1686), and the sculptor, Jean Rousselet (1656–1693), both of whom were members of the Académie royale de peinture et de sculpture.

In 1757, she married engraver and cartographer, Pierre François Tardieu, as his second wife. The couple worked together at times. After her husband's death in 1771, she achieved recognition for her work and contributions. Marie-Anne made several engravings of historical and genre subjects, including Saint John the Baptist (1756) after Jean-Baptiste van Loo.

She died in Paris on 1826.

Her work is in public collections including the Nationalmuseum of Stockholm, Rijksmuseum, among others.

Publications 
These are known publications that featured engraving work by Rousselet.

References 

1732 births
1826 deaths
French engravers
Women engravers
Artists from Paris
18th-century engravers
18th-century French artists
18th-century French women artists
French women printmakers